The Gothenburg Tercentennial Jubilee Exposition (in Swedish Jubileumsutställningen i Göteborg) was a world's fair held in Gothenburg, Sweden during 1923  marking 300th anniversary of the founding  of the city. The fair opened 8 May and ran until 30 September.

Exhibits and buildings

One site was at Liseberg, an existing gardened area. It was opened to the public for the exhibition, hosted several pavilions, including an industrial art house, an exports exhibition, a congress hall and a machine hall and amusement rides including a carousel.

The Arts and Craft Pavilion was designed by Hakon Ahlberg and the arts exhibition pavilion by architects Sigfrid Ericson (1879-1958) and Arvid Bjerke (1880-1952) . Artist David Wallin had a solo exhibition in here including his paintings Summer and Springtime in the forest.

Legacy
The Liseberg site continued as an amusement park, and is now the most visited tourist attraction in Sweden, receiving 3 million visits annually.

The arts exhibition building is now a contemporary arts gallery, the Göteborgs Konsthall near to the extant Götaplatsen square which was inaugurated for the fair.

Gallery

See also
 Gothenburg Botanical Garden
Gothenburg quadricentennial jubilee

References

Related reading
Södergren, Arvid (1923) Historiskt kartverk över Göteborg upprättat för jubileumsutställningen i Göteborg (Göteborg: V. Wengelin)

External links
 A plan of Göteborgs Konsthall as it looked in 1923 
 Images taken from the official brochure

World's fairs in Sweden
1920s in Gothenburg
1923 in Sweden
Events in Gothenburg
Tricentennial anniversaries